A backup site or work area recovery site is a location where an organization can relocate following a disaster, such as fire, flood, terrorist threat or other disruptive event. This is an integral part of the disaster recovery plan and wider business continuity planning of an organization.

A backup, or alternate, site can be another data center location operated by the organization, or contracted via a company that specializes in disaster recovery services. In some cases, one organization will have an agreement with a second organization to operate a joint backup site. In addition, an organization may have a reciprocal agreement with another organization to set up a site at each of their data centers.

Sites are generally classified based on how prepared they are and the speed with which they can be brought into operation: "cold" (facility is prepared), "warm" (equipment is in place), "hot" (operational data is loaded) – with increasing cost to implement and maintain with increasing "temperature".

Classification

Cold site
A cold site is an empty operational spaces with basic facilities like raised floors, air conditioning, power and communication lines etc. Following an incident equipment is brought in and set up to resume operations. It does not include backed up copies of data and information from the original location of the organization, nor does it include hardware already set up. The lack of provisioned hardware contributes to the minimal start-up costs of the cold site, but requires additional time following the disaster to have the operation running at a capacity close to that prior to the disaster. In some cases, a cold site may have equipment available, but it is not operational.

Warm site
A warm site is a compromise between hot and cold.  These sites will have hardware and connectivity already established, though on a smaller scale. Warm sites might have backups on hand, but they may not be complete and may be between several days and a week old.  The recovery will be delayed while backup tapes are delivered to the warm site, or network connectivity is established and data is recovered from a remote backup site.

Hot site
A hot site is a near duplicate of the original site of the organization, with full computer systems as well as complete backups of user data. Real time synchronization between the two sites may be used to completely mirror the data environment of the original site using wide area network links and specialized software. Following a disruption to the original site, the hot site exists so that the organization can relocate, with minimal losses to normal operations in the shortest recovery time. Ideally, a hot site will be up and running within a matter of hours. Personnel may have to be moved to the hot site, but it is possible that the hot site may be operational from a data processing perspective before staff has relocated. The capacity of the hot site may or may not match the capacity of the original site depending on the organization's requirements. This type of backup site is the most expensive to operate. Hot sites are popular with organizations that operate real time processes such as financial institutions, government agencies and eCommerce providers.

The most important feature offered from a hot site is that the production environment(s) is running concurrently with the main datacenter. This syncing allows for minimal impact and downtime to business operations. In the event of a significant outage event, the hot site can take the place of the impacted site immediately. However, this level of redundancy does not come cheap, and businesses will have to weigh the cost-benefit-analysis (CBA) of hot site utilization.

Nowadays if the backup site is down and misses the "proactive" approach it may not be considered a hot site depending on the level of maturity of the organization regarding the ISO 22301 approach (international standard for Business Continuity Management).

Alternate sites 
Generally, an Alternate Site refers to a site where people and the equipment that they need to work is relocated for a period of time until the normal production environment, whether reconstituted or replaced, is available.

Choosing
Choosing the type of backup site to be used is decided by an organizations based on a cost vs. benefit analysis. Hot sites are traditionally more expensive than cold sites, since much of the equipment the company needs must be purchased and thus people are needed to maintain it, making the operational costs higher. However, if the same organization loses a substantial amount of revenue for each day they are inactive, then it may be worth the cost. Another advantage of a hot site is that it can be used for operations prior to a disaster happening. This load balanced production processing method can be cost effective, and will provide the users with the security of minimal downtime during an event that affects one of the data centers.

The advantages of a cold site are simple — cost. It requires fewer resources to operate a cold site because no equipment has been brought prior to the disaster. Some organizations may store older versions of the hardware in the center. This may be appropriate in a server farm environment, where old hardware could be used in many cases. The downside with a cold site is the potential cost that must be incurred in order to make the cold site effective. The costs of purchasing equipment on very short notice may be higher and the disaster may make the equipment difficult to obtain.

Commercial sites 
When contracting services from a commercial provider of backup site capability, organizations should take note of contractual usage provision and invocation procedures. Providers may sign up more than one organization for a given site or facility, often depending on various service levels. This is a reasonable proposition as it is unlikely that all organizations using the service are likely to need it at the same time and it allows the provider to offer the service at an affordable cost. However, in a large scale incident that affects a wide area, it is likely that these facilities will become over-subscribed. An organization can request Priority Service from the provider, often with a higher monthly fee. The commercial site can also be used as the secondary production site with a full scale mirroring environment for their primary data center. Again, a higher fee will be required, but the security of the site and the ability of the organization to provide its users with uninterrupted access to their data and applications could justify the cost.

See also 
 Off-site Data Protection
 Backup

References

General references
 Records Management Services (2004, July 15). Vital Records: How Do You Protect And Store Vital Records?
 Haag, Cummings, McCubbrey, Pinsonneult, and Donovan. (2004). Information Management Systems, For The Information Age. McGraw-Hill Ryerson.
 IT Service Continuity (2007, ITIL v3). IT Service Continuity. Retrieved from: http://itlibrary.org/index.php?page=IT_Service_Continuity_Management on 03SEP14
 The Three Stages of Disaster Recovery Sites by Bryce CarrollNovember 20th, 2013

Backup